In pharmacology, the international unit (IU) is a unit of measurement for the effect, not mass, of a substance; the variance is based on the biological activity or effect, for the purpose of easier comparison across similar forms of substances. International units are used to quantify vitamins, hormones, some medications, vaccines, blood products, and similar biologically active substances.

Many biological agents exist in different forms or preparations (e.g. vitamin A in the form of retinol or beta-carotene). The goal of the IU is to be able to compare these, so that different forms or preparations with the same biological effect will contain the same number of IUs. To do so, the WHO Expert Committee on Biological Standardization provides a reference preparation of the agent, arbitrarily sets the number of IUs contained in that preparation, and specifies a biological procedure to compare other preparations of the same agent to the reference preparation. Since the number of IUs contained in a new substance is arbitrarily set, there is no equivalence between IU measurements of different biological agents. For instance, one IU of vitamin E cannot be equated with one IU of vitamin A in any way, including mass or efficacy.

The term international unit is also used to describe any of various physical or monetary units agreed upon internationally, in particular one forming part of the International System of Units (SI). International units as used in pharmacology are not part of the SI. The IU is distinct from the enzyme unit, also known as the international unit of enzyme activity and abbreviated as U.

Equality and equivalency of IU for different substances

To define the IU for a substance, an international collaborative study is organized by the WHO Expert Committee on Biological Standardization using various assay systems in several laboratories.  The main goal of the study is to reach a consensus regarding methods of analysis and the approach to standardization so that results can be compared.

The study is performed using highly purified preparations of the substance, typically in lyophilized form, called "international reference preparations" or IRPs.  Each preparation is divided into precisely weighed samples, with each sample stored in its own ampoule labeled with a code corresponding to the source IRP.  Assays are performed using these samples and are calibrated against the previously available IU standard.  These results can be quite variable; the final IU value for samples of a given IRP are determined by consensus.  The IRP that provides the best results and shows the best long term stability is selected to define the next IU.  This IRP is then referred to as the "international standard."

Mass equivalents of 1 IU
For some substances, the precise mass equivalent of one IU has been changed. When that happens, the former IU mass for that substance is officially abandoned in favor of a newly established mass.  Such a change has happened with the immunoassay standards for prolactin: as one batch of standard (84/500; 53 mIU ≈ 2.5 μg) was running out of stock, a new standard (83/573; 67 mIU ≈ 3.2 μg) was calibrated against the old one (as 67.2 mIU) and replaced the former.

Micronutrients:
 1 IU Vitamin A = 0.3 μg retinol (~0.1 nmol) = 0.6 μg beta-carotene
 1 IU Vitamin D = 0.025 µg D2/D3 ≈ 0.65 pmol
 1 IU Vitamin E =  mg d-alpha-tocopherol = 0.90 mg of dl-alpha-tocopherol

Peptides:
 1 IU insulin ≙ 0.0347 mg human insulin (28.8 IU/mg)
 1 IU Oxytocin ≙ 1.68 μg of pure peptide

Languages 
The name international unit is often capitalized in English and other languages, although major English-language dictionaries treat it as a common noun and thus use lower case. The name has several accepted abbreviations. It is usually abbreviated as IU in English, and UI in Romance languages (for example Spanish unidad internacional, French unité internationale, Italian unità internazionale, Romanian unitate internațională), IE in several Germanic languages (for example German internationale Einheit, Dutch internationale eenheid) or as other forms (for example Russian МЕ, международная единица [mezhdunarodnaya yedinitsa], Hungarian NE, nemzetközi egység).

In order to remove the possibility of having the letter "I" confused with the digit "1", some hospitals have it as a stated policy omit the "I", that is, to only use U or E when talking and writing about dosages, while other hospitals require the word "units" (or words "international units") to be written out entirely.  (For example, "three international units per litre" may be abbreviated "3 U/L". The "liter" sign (L) is less affected, as less confusing written forms are used.)

See also
 United States Pharmacopeia (USP)

References

Notes

Citations

External links

 WHO reference preparations
 Online converter with authoritative references for all substances

Units of measurement
Dosage forms